The 1946 Paris–Nice was the eighth edition of the Paris–Nice cycle race and was held from 1 May to 5 May 1946. The race started in Choisy-le-Roi and finished in Nice. The race was won by Fermo Camellini.

General classification

References

1946
1946 in road cycling
1946 in French sport
March 1946 sports events in the United States